Line Noro (22 February 1900 – 4 November 1985) was a French stage and film actress. During the 1930s she played glamorous, often exotic, women in films such as Pépé le Moko. Between 1945 and 1966 Noro was a member of the Comédie Française. She was married to the film director  André Berthomieu.

Selected filmography
 The Divine Voyage (1929)
 Montmartre (1931)
 La Tête d'un homme (1933)
 Little Jacques (1934)
 The Flame (1936)
 Pépé le Moko (1937)
 J'accuse! (1938)
 Ramuntcho (1938)
 Street Without Joy (1938)
 The Well-Digger's Daughter (1940)
 The Secret of Madame Clapain (1943)
 The Count of Monte Cristo (1943)
 La Fiancée des ténèbres (1945)
 Girl with Grey Eyes (1945)
 Jericho (1946)
 Pastoral Symphony (1946)
 The Lost Village (1947)
 Eternal Conflict (1948)
 The Road to Damascus (1952)
 Before the Deluge (1954)

References

Bibliography
 Hayward, Susan. French National Cinema. Routledge, 2006.

External links

1900 births
1985 deaths
French film actresses
French stage actresses
20th-century French actresses